Jane Sachs (née Webb, born 19 June 1972) is an Australian wheelchair basketball player, who has won two medals at three Paralympics from 1996 to 2004.

Personal
Sachs was born in Hobart on 19 June 1972. She competed in running and played netball before an accident at the age of nine, when she fell from a tree and landed on an exposed tree root, breaking her back. She works as a consultant for Westpac and lives in Sydney. She was married to wheelchair basketballer Troy Sachs and the couple had a daughter.

Career
Sachs, a 3 point player, first represented Australia in the national wheelchair basketball squad at the 1989 FESPIC Games. She competed in the 1990 and 1994 Gold Cups, receiving a bronze medal in the latter event, and the 1994 FESPIC Games. Her first Paralympics was the 1996 Atlanta Games, where her team came fourth, and she won a bronze medal with her team at the 1998 Gold Cup. She won silver medals with her team at the 2000 Sydney and 2004 Athens Paralympics. She has played for the West Sydney Razorbacks and, most recently, the Stacks Goudkamp Bears (previously the North Sydney Bears).

References

External links

  (1996, 2000)
  (2004)

1972 births
Living people
Paralympic wheelchair basketball players of Australia
Paralympic silver medalists for Australia
Paralympic medalists in wheelchair basketball
Wheelchair category Paralympic competitors
Wheelchair basketball players at the 1996 Summer Paralympics
Wheelchair basketball players at the 2000 Summer Paralympics
Wheelchair basketball players at the 2004 Summer Paralympics
Medalists at the 2000 Summer Paralympics
Medalists at the 2004 Summer Paralympics
FESPIC Games competitors
People with paraplegia
Sportswomen from Tasmania
Sportswomen from New South Wales
Basketball players from Sydney